Serena is a feminine given name. It is derived from the Latin word , meaning "clear, tranquil, serene". This name was borne by one of the first saint, Saint Serena of Rome, wife of the Emperor Diocletian.

People
Prisca Serena (wife of the Emperor Diocletian)
Serena (wife of Stilicho) (c. 370–408), important noblewoman of the late Western Roman Empire
Serena Altschul (born 1970), broadcast journalist
Serena Katherine Dandridge (1878–1956), American scientific illustrator, painter, naturalist, and suffragist
Serena DeBeer, American chemist
Serena Deeb (born 1986), American professional wrestler
Serena Grandi (born 1958), Italian actress
Serena McKay (1997–2017), a Canadian woman whose brutal murder was posted online (see Murder of Serena McKay)
Serena Nanda (born 1938), American author, anthropologist, and professor emeritus
Serena Ortolani (born 1987), Italian volleyball player
Serena Ryder (born 1982), Canadian singer/songwriter
Serena Shim (1985–2014), American journalist
Serena Williams (born 1981), American tennis player

Fictional characters 
Serena, cousin of main character Samantha Stephens in Bewitched; both roles were played by Elizabeth Montgomery
Serena (Pokémon), the playable female protagonist in Pokémon X and Y and one of the main characters in the Pokémon anime
Serena, in Edmund Spenser's poem The Faerie Queene
Serena, in the film Terminator Salvation
Serena, in the PBS Kids show Super Why!
Serena, a swan in E. B. White's children's novel The Trumpet of the Swan
 Serena, one of the main characters from the video game Dragon Quest XI
 Serena the Healer, one of the heroes from the video game Master of Magic
Serena, a character played by Deepika Padukone in XXX: The Return of Xander Cage
Serena Baldwin, in the American soap operas General Hospital and Port Charles
Serena Bishop, in the Australian soap opera Neighbours
Serena Butler, from the Legends of Dune series of books
Serena Kamin, in the 1998 American comedy movie My Giant
Serena Southerlyn, a district attorney in Law & Order
Serena Tsukino, the English dub name of the Japanese character Usagi Tsukino (English: Sailor Moon), the main character in Sailor Moon media
Serena van der Woodsen, Gossip Girl character
Serena Joy Waterford, an antagonistic character in Handmaid's Tale and television adaptation

See also
Serena (disambiguation)

Italian feminine given names
English feminine given names